Pascal Mérigeau (30 January 1953, Périgné in Deux-Sèvres) is a French journalist and film critic.

Biography 
After studying in Poitiers, he settled in Paris in 1976 and became a journalist. He worked for film magazines, then for Les Nouvelles littéraires, Le Point and Le Monde, before collaborating to Le Nouvel Observateur from September 1997.

He participated in the selection of films for the Cannes Film Festival, currently replaced by Eric Libiot.

A novelist, he also writes short stories, including Quand Angèle fut seule written in 1983.

Publications 
 Novels
 Escaliers dérobés, Denoël, 1994
 Max Lang n'est plus ici, Denoël, 1999
 on cinema
 Faye Dunaway, PAC, 1978
 Annie Girardot, PAC, 1978
 Josef Von Sternberg, Edilig, 1983
 Série B (with Stéphane Bourgoin), Edilig, 1983
 Gene Tierney, Edilig, 1987
 Mankiewicz, Denoël, 1993
 L'aventure vraie de Canal +, with Jacques bayard, 2001
 Maurice Pialat. L'Imprécateur, Grasset, 2003
 Pialat, la rage au cœur, Ramsay, 2007
 Cinéma : autopsie d'un meurtre, Flammarion, 2007
 Depardieu, Flammarion, 2008
 Jean Renoir, Flammarion, 2012

Honours 
1995: Prize for best book on cinema, for Mankiewicz
2010: Raymond Chirat Prize (Lumière Film Festival)
2013: Prize for the best French book on cinema & Prix Goncourt de la biographie for Jean Renoir

Notes

References

External links 
 Pascal Mérigeau on data.bnf.fr
 Pascal Mérigeau on France Inter
 Pascal Mérigeau à la tête de la commission d'Aide sélective à la distribution du CNC
 Pascal Mérigeau se présente

French film critics
20th-century French journalists
21st-century French journalists
21st-century French writers
20th-century French novelists
French biographers
Prix Goncourt de la Biographie winners
People from Deux-Sèvres
1953 births
Living people